Wellton Hills is a census-designated place in Yuma County, in the U.S. state of Arizona. The population was 258 at the 2010 census.

Geography
Wellton Hills is located across from the Barry M. Goldwater Air Force Range. Wellton Hills terrain consists of the Sonoran Desert. This range is both used by the Department of Defense for training purposes and is a major hub for illegal immigration. In 2012, a new $22 million  Border Patrol facility was opened to combat this.

Demographics

References

Census-designated places in Yuma County, Arizona
Census-designated places in Arizona